The Philippines men's national beach volleyball team is the national team of Philippines for beach volleyball. It is governed by Philippine National Volleyball Federation (PNVF) since 2021.

Rankings 
The following pairs included are in the top 1,000 in the FIVB World Rankings.

Current squad

Competitive record
The following are the rank of the Philippines men's beach volleyball team in past tournaments.

Volleyball World Beach Pro Tour

FIVB Beach Volleyball World Tour

Asian Games

Asian Beach Games

Asian Beach Volleyball Championship

AVC Beach Volleyball Continental Cup

AVC Beach Tour

South East Asian Games

South East Asian Beach Volleyball Championship

Youth teams

Coaches
 Dante Lopez (2009)
 Rhovyl Verayo (2021–2022)
 João Luciano Kioday (2022–)

See also
 Philippines women's national beach volleyball team
 Philippines women's national volleyball team
 Philippines men's national volleyball team
 Beach Volleyball Republic
 Volleyball in the Philippines

References

Volleyball in the Philippines
V
National women's volleyball teams